Weihergraben may refer to:

 Weihergraben (Altmühl), a river of Bavaria, Germany, a tributary of the Altmühl
 Weihergraben (Zipser Mühlbach), a river of Bavaria, Germany, a tributary of the Zipser Mühlbach
 Walkershöfer Weihergraben, a river of Bavaria, Germany, a tributary of the Swabian Rezat